FC Volyn Lutsk is a professional Ukrainian football team of the Ukrainian First League playing in the city of Lutsk.

Since its establishment in 1960, the club became the only major (professional) football club within Volyn Oblast and uncontested leader of football in the region.

History
Football in Volyn Oblast takes its roots from the Polish regional league of Wolyn Voivodeship that was liquidated during the World War II in 1939. The best city's team Policejski Klub Sportowy (PKS) Lutsk competed along with other clubs of the region with many clubs of the today's neighboring Rivne Oblast. Before establishing of FC Volyn, the best clubs of the region were Dynamo Lutsk (1940-1956) and army club GDO (Garrison Officers' Club, 1957-1959). Both clubs competed at Republican competitions that until 1959 were considered to be amateur.

The Lutsk professional club was formed in 1960 initially as Avanhard, after the Soviet Avanhard (Avangard) sports society, but before the start of competition the name was changed to Volyn. The club initially entered the third division of Soviet professional football. In 1968 the Lutsk Machinebuilding Factory became the club's new sponsor (today – LuAZ) and changed its name to Torpedo. However, in 1971 the club declared insolvency. The city was represented by SKA Lvov of Carpathian Military District that relocated to Lutsk. In 1977 the club was revived as Torpedo and re-entered the Soviet third division where it continued to participate until the fall of the Soviet regime. On January 30, 1989 Torpedo was succeeded by new club Volyn. The club took part in the Ukrainian Premier League from its first championship in 1992. They were later sent down to Persha Liha after the 1995–96 season. They later returned to the Ukrainian Premier League in the 2002–03 season, but they were relegated again after finishing 15th place in the 2005–06 season. The team once more gained promotion to the Ukrainian Premier League for the
2010–11 season.

Their home stadium is Avanhard Stadium.

Colours are (Home) light red shirt, deep red shorts;
(Away) white shirt with light red collar and upper sleeve, white shorts.

Team names
Over the course of its history, the club carried two names Volyn which is a Ukrainian spelling of historical region of Volhynia and Torpedo which in the Soviet Union was a generic name of those clubs that represented some automobile makers.

Football kits and sponsors

Rivalry
Volyn's biggest rival today is Karpaty Lviv. The match between is called the Galician-Volhynian rivalry. The stadiums in Lutsk and Lviv are nearly full for matches between the two teams. This derbys are the main football events in western Ukraine.

All time rival of Volyn Lutsk is FC Veres Rivne. The rivalry exists since the creation of club in 1960 and is known as Volhynian rivalry.

Galician-Volhynian rivalry

Volhynian rivalry
The regional rivalry includes games between Avanhard Rovno and SC Lutsk (last one being represented by the Carpathian Military District).

Squad

Out on loan

Coaches and administration

Officials
 1992 Anatoliy Banasevych (president)
 2006 – 2000 Anatoliy Banasevych (president)
 2002 – 2013 Vasyl Stolyar (president)
 2013 – 2017 Vitaliy Kvartsyanyi (president)
 2017 – Vitaliy Kvartsyanyi (honorary president)

Head coaches

Club's top scorers and appearance leaders

Honors
Ukrainian First League
Winners (1): 2001–02
Football Championship of the Ukrainian SSR
Winner (1): 1989

League and cup history

Soviet Union

Ukraine

Notes

References

External links
 
 
  FC Volyn website
 FC Volyn Lutsk profile at UEFA.com
 Volyn Lutsk profile at Official website of the Ukrainian Premier League
 Ukrainian Soccer Team Volyn 

 
Ukrainian First League clubs
Association football clubs established in 1960
1960 establishments in Ukraine
Football clubs in the Ukrainian Soviet Socialist Republic
Sport in Lutsk
Football clubs in Volyn Oblast
Avanhard (sports society)